Krog may refer to:
 Krog, a hamlet of Sečovlje, Slovenia
 Krog, Murska Sobota, a village in Slovenia
 Krog, Cerkno, a hamlet of Cerkljanski Vrh, Slovenia
 Krog, a character from the Mixels franchise
 Krog (surname)

KROG may refer to:
 KROG, an American radio station from Oregon
 Rogers Executive Airport (ICAO code: KROG), an airport in Arkansas, US